Eric Pigors is an American artist based in Santa Clarita, California, mostly known for his 'ToxicToons'. They are cartoons of silly gruesome creatures, such as deformed monsters, zombies and vampires. He worked for Disney Animation for over fifteen years then Warner Bros. Animation for several years and now is self-employed. He vending his New media art wares at his ToxicToons website .

Eric produces printed books and prints of his unique cartoon character art, along with memorabilia including stickers, T-shirts, prints, buttons and other collectibles.

He has a large following on Instagram https://www.instagram.com/toxictoons/ where his fans can see clips of his Born-digital art production process and commentary.

Career
Pigors came up with the name ToxicToons in 1990 while he was choking on a cloud of toxic fumes from a spray can. He was using the spray can to paint the backgrounds used for a batch of his cartoons.

For over 18 years, Pigors worked in the Hollywood animation industry. When he worked for Walt Disney Feature Animation he started out doing hand drawn work on films  then transitioned to the digital 2D system of creating art that he uses today.

Works
Pigors has worked on the following movies, shows and video games:

Movies
 Starchaser: The Legend of Orin (1985) (Inbetween Artist)
 Oliver & Company (1988) (Breakdown and Inbetween Artist)
 The Little Mermaid (1989) (Breakdown and Inbetween Artist)
 The Rescuers Down Under (1990) (Assistant Animator)
 Beauty and the Beast (1991) (Assistant Animator: "Wolves")
 Aladdin (1992) (Assistant Animator: "Rajah" and "Guards")
 The Lion King (1994) (Key Assistant: "Hyenas")
 Pocahontas (1995) (Key Assistant: "Governor Ratcliffe")
 The Hunchback of Notre Dame (1996) (Key Assistant: Additional Clean-Up Animation)
 Hercules (1997) (Key Assistant: "Hades")
 Tarzan (1999) (Key Assistant: "Kerchak")
 Fantasia 2000 (2000) (Key Assistant)
 Atlantis: The Lost Empire (2001) (Key Assistant: "Atlantean King Kashekim Nedakh")
 Treasure Planet (2002) (Visual Development Artist/Character Designer) / (Key Assistant: "Captain Long John Silver")
 Looney Tunes: Back in Action (2003) (Key Assistant Animator)
 Home on the Range (2004) (Key Assistant: "Alameda Slim" and "Junior the Buffalo")
 The Princess and the Frog (2009) (Key Assistant: "Charlotte "Lottie" La Bouff")

Shows
 Family Dog (1993) designed by Tim Burton.
 Ed, Edd n Eddy's Boo Haw Haw Halloween Special (2005)
 The Looney Tunes Show (2012 - 2013) (Storyboard Clean-Up Artist - 4 Episodes)
 New Looney Tunes (2015 - 2016) (Storyboard Cleanup - 19 Episodes)

Shorts
 Technological Threat (1988) (Designer) / (Assistant Animator)
 Runaway Brain (1995) (Additional Clean-Up Artist)

Video Shorts
 One by One (2004) (Clean-Up Artist)
 Kung Fu Panda: Secrets of the Masters (2011) (Clean-Up Animator: Duncan Studio Production)

Video Games
 JumpStart Adventures 3rd Grade: Mystery Mountain (1996) (Animator)
 Spy Fox in "Dry Cereal" (1997) (Assistant Animator)
 Pajama Sam 2: Thunder and Lightning Aren't so Frightening (1998) (Assistant Animator)
 Pajama Sam 3: You Are What You Eat from Your Head to Your Feet (2000) (Assistant Animator)

Publications
 Pigors, Eric. Unkle Pigors's Ghoulishly Ghastly Deadtime Stories / by Eric Pigors. Valencia, California: Eric Pigors, c2003. 1 v. (unpaged): ill. (some col.); 26 cm. 
 Pigors, Eric. Toxic Toons / Eric Pigors. (Valencia, California): Eric Pigors, c1999. 1 v. (unpaged): chiefly ill. (some col.); 28 cm.
 Pigors, Eric. Cobwebs and Vinegar: The Art of Eric Pigors. 1st ed. Valencia, California: Eric Pigors, [2005?] 1 v. (unpaged): col. ill.; 26 cm.

Film
 Nurse Hackit in Let’s Chop Soo-E / International Rocketship Limited; designed, animated, and directed by Eric Pigors; producer, Marv Newland. Canada: [s.n.], 1991. 1 reel of 1 (629 ft.): sd., col.; 35 mm. ref print.

References

External links
 
  ToxicToons WebSite 

American animators
Living people
People from Valencia, Santa Clarita, California
Year of birth missing (living people)